Florian Flick (born 1 May 2000) is a German professional footballer who plays as a defensive midfielder for 2. Bundesliga club 1. FC Nürnberg, on loan from Schalke 04.

Club career
Flick made his first team debut for Schalke 04 in a 4–2 away defeat against 1899 Hoffenheim on 8 May 2021, playing the complete 90 minutes. He scored his first goal for the senior team in a 4–3 win over Eintracht Frankfurt on 15 May 2021. He signed a professional contract with the club on 25 May 2021, lasting until 2023.

On 8 December 2022, he joined on loan 2. Bundesliga club 1. FC Nürnberg for the second half of the season.

International career
Flick debuted for the German U-21 national team in a 2–1 win against Poland on 7 June 2022, coming on as a substitute in the 68th minute.

Career statistics

Honours
Schalke 04
2. Bundesliga: 2021–22

References

Living people
2000 births
Association football midfielders
Footballers from Mannheim
German footballers
SV Waldhof Mannheim players
FC Schalke 04 II players
FC Schalke 04 players
1. FC Nürnberg players
Bundesliga players
2. Bundesliga players
3. Liga players
Regionalliga players
Germany under-21 international footballers